Illeginni (Marshallese:) is an island in the Kwajalein Atoll, part of the Republic of the Marshall Islands (RMI).

The island runs roughly west-northwest to east-southeast. The northwestern end is a narrow finger that extends into several sandbars, while the southeastern end has a hook-shaped harbor on the north side.

Illeginni was the site of a Sprint missile launcher during the 1960s, part of the Nike-X anti-ballistic missile program. Sprint was a very short range system, and relied on a number of bases being spread around the area to be defended, one of these containing the control systems and master radar. Meck Island was the main base in the test system, while Illeginni was a model of the distributed launch sites. As Nike-X was modified to become Safeguard, Illeginni's site was changed (before construction) to hold four Sprint and four LIM-49 Spartan launchers. The launcher was abandoned after the Safeguard test program ended in the early 1970s.

A number of automated tracking cameras were installed as part of the Safeguard program, and one of these remains in use today to support overall operations of the Ronald Reagan Ballistic Missile Defense Test Site. The island also includes one of the two remote receivers for the TRADEX radar on Roi-Namur, the other remote is on Gellinam, close to Meck. When used together, the three radars are known as the Multistatic Measurement System, or MMS.

A harbor has been dredged in the northern side of the eastern end of the island, where it is its widest. The coral dredged from the harbor was used to build the berm for the missile silos. A helipad was installed on the eastern end of the island, adjacent to the harbor, but modern photography shows a new helipad on the former missile silos on the western end.

References

Islands of the Marshall Islands